This is a list of the tallest and largest buildings in Pasadena, California.

Tallest buildings

National Register of Historic Places
see National Register of Historic Places listings in Pasadena, California.

External links

 01
Pasadena